Following is the family tree of Vietnamese monarchs from the autonomous period of the Khúc clan (905–923) to the reign of Bảo Đại (1926–1945), the last emperor of the Nguyễn dynasty. Emperors, kings and lords of each monarch are denoted by different colours with the period of their reigns.

Timeline

Family tree
Colour notes

931–1413

1428–1945

Notes

  Kiều Công Tiễn was only adopted son of Dương Đình Nghệ.
  Although being a king of the Ngô dynasty, Dương Tam Kha came from the Dương family as he is Dương Đình Nghệ's son.
  Dương Nhật Lễ was only adopted son of Prince Cung Túc, so he did not bear the family name Trần like other emperors of the Trần dynasty.
  The second elder brother of Lê Thái Tổ was Grand Duke Lam Lê Trừ whose son was Grand Duke Quỳ Lê Khang. Lê Khang was the great-great-grandfather of the emperor Lê Anh Tông. Because Lê Trung Tông died without any son, Lê Anh Tông was chosen for the throne.
  Lê Thần Tông held the throne from 1619 to 1643 and again from 1649 to 1662 in replacing his son Lê Chân Tông who died soon.
  Normally the persons in two successive boxes are connected by parental relation, however in this case, Trịnh Cương was not son, but great-grandson of Trịnh Căn. Since Trịnh Cương's father and grandfather both died before the death of Trịnh Căn, Trịnh Cương was chosen the successor of the Trịnh Lord.
  Gia Long held the position Nguyễn Lord from 1781 to 1802, afterward he became the first emperor of the Nguyễn dynasty from 1802 to 1819.

References

Notes

Bibliography

See also

Vietnamese royalty
Vietnamese dynasties
Vietnam
Monarchs